Geitoneura is a genus of nymphalid butterflies, commonly known as xenicas. The genus contains three species.

Species
Geitoneura acantha (Donovan, 1805) – eastern ringed xenica
Geitoneura klugii (Guérin-Méneville, [1831]) – common xenica or Klug's xenica
Geitoneura minyas (Waterhouse & Lyell, 1914) –  western xenica

External links
"Geitoneura Butler, 1867" at Markku Savela's Lepidoptera and Some Other Life Forms
Geitoneura at the  Australian Faunal Directory

Satyrini
Butterfly genera
Taxa named by Arthur Gardiner Butler